The Howard Pyle Studios are two historic buildings used for painting and teaching by illustrator Howard Pyle. The studios are located in a densely populated neighborhood near Brandywine Park and the Delaware Avenue Historic District.  The building used by Pyle as his own studio was built in 1883, mainly in brick with a Tudor Revival half timbered gable.  The smaller studio, that Pyle used for teaching, was built in a similar style in 1900.  After Pyle's death in 1911, the buildings were owned by Stanley Arthurs, until 1950, and then by Ellen duPont Wheelwright until 1964.  The Studio Group acquired the studios in 1964 and continues to use them as art studios. In 1978, the property was listed on the National Register of Historic Places.

History
Pyle's interest in English history was reflected in the 1883 studio, which was built in a style variously described as Tudor Revival, Queen Anne style, or 
"Shavian Manorial",  because of its similarity to works by English architect Richard Norman Shaw.
The original studio was set back eighty feet from the street and has a steeply pitched roof.  One gable forms the main facade of the studio framing the entry porch and a triple casement window.

The brick studio school was built in 1900 in a similar style.  It fronts on the street and occupies the south side of the property.  Pyle's students attended at no charge.  A total of 75 students attended between 1900 and 1911, including N.C. Wyeth,  Frank Schoonover,  Harvey Dunn,  Stanley Arthurs, and George Harding.

See also
Delaware Art Museum
Frank E. Schoonover Studios

References

External links
Howard Pyle Studio History, the Studio Group
Studio Group Archive, Delaware Art Museum
A brush with the past, Newsworks, WHYY-TV, video, 4:23, September 1, 2011.
Where In Wilmington - August 2011 - Howard Pyle Studio, YouTube video. 9:27, August 2011.

Commercial buildings on the National Register of Historic Places in Delaware
Tudor Revival architecture in Delaware
Commercial buildings completed in 1883
Buildings and structures in New Castle County, Delaware
National Register of Historic Places in Wilmington, Delaware
Individually listed contributing properties to historic districts on the National Register in Delaware
Commercial buildings completed in 1900